Joel Sheldon Wilson (born 30 December 1966) is an international cricket umpire from Trinidad and Tobago. Wilson is currently a member of the Elite Panel of ICC Umpires, representing the West Indies. He stands in matches of all the three formats of international cricket – Tests, One Day Internationals (ODIs) and Twenty20 Internationals (T20Is).

Umpiring career
Joel Wilson was one of the twenty umpires selected to stand in matches during the 2015 Cricket World Cup hosted by Australia and New Zealand. Wilson served as an on-field umpire in three matches in Australia during the tournament. A few months later, Wilson stood in his first Test match as an umpire in the match between Bangladesh and South Africa at Chittagong from 21–25 July 2015.

In April 2019, he was named as one of the sixteen umpires to stand in matches during the 2019 Cricket World Cup. In July 2019, Wilson was promoted to the Elite Panel of ICC Umpires following the retirement of Ian Gould and the exclusion of Sundaram Ravi.

See also
 List of Test cricket umpires
 List of ODI cricket umpires
 List of T20I cricket umpires

References

External links
 
 

1966 births
Living people
Trinidad and Tobago cricket umpires
West Indian Test cricket umpires
West Indian One Day International cricket umpires
West Indian Twenty20 International cricket umpires